Niegosławice may refer to the following places in Poland:
Niegosławice, Lubusz Voivodeship (west Poland), formerly Waltersdorf 
Niegosławice, Busko County in Świętokrzyskie Voivodeship (south-central Poland)
Niegosławice, Jędrzejów County in Świętokrzyskie Voivodeship (south-central Poland)
Niegosławice, Pińczów County in Świętokrzyskie Voivodeship (south-central Poland)